Jannis Kübler (born 25 May 1999) is a German footballer who plays as a midfielder for an amateur side FV Fortuna Kirchfeld.

Club career
Kübler made his professional debut for Carl Zeiss Jena in the 3. Liga on 26 January 2019, starting in the home match against Preußen Münster, which finished as a 0–0 draw.

International career
Kübler was included in Germany's squad for the 2016 UEFA European Under-17 Championship in Azerbaijan. The team managed to reach the semi-finals, before losing 1–2 against Spain.

References

External links
 Profile at DFB.de
 

1999 births
Living people
Footballers from Karlsruhe
German footballers
Germany youth international footballers
Association football midfielders
FC Schalke 04 II players
FC Carl Zeiss Jena players
SV 19 Straelen players
Wuppertaler SV players
3. Liga players
Regionalliga players
Oberliga (football) players
21st-century German people